This is a list of Romanian football transfers for the 2019–20 winter transfer window. Only moves featuring 2019–20 Liga I and 2019–20 Liga II are listed.

Liga I

Academica Clinceni

In:

Out:

Astra Giurgiu

In:

Out:

Botoșani

In:

Out:

CFR Cluj

In:

Out:

Chindia Târgoviște

In:

Out:

Dinamo București

In:

Out:

FCSB

In:

Out:

Gaz Metan Mediaș

In:

Out:

Hermannstadt

In:

Out:

Politehnica Iași

In:

Out:

Sepsi Sfântu Gheorghe

In:

Out:

Universitatea Craiova

In:

	

Out:

Viitorul Constanța

In:

Out:

Voluntari

In:

Out:

Liga II

Argeș Pitești

In:

Out:

ASU Politehnica Timișoara

In:

Out:

Concordia Chiajna

In:

Out:

CSM Reșița

In:

Out:

Daco-Getica București (excluded)

In:

Out:

Dunărea Călărași

In:

Out:

Farul Constanța

In:

Out:

Metaloglobus București

In:

Out:

Miercurea Ciuc

In:

Out:

Mioveni

In:

Out:

Pandurii Târgu Jiu

In:

Out:

Petrolul Ploiești

In:

Out:

Rapid București

In:

Out:

Ripensia Timișoara

In:

Out:

SCM Gloria Buzău

In:

Out:

Sportul Snagov (excluded)

In:

Out:

Turris Turnu Măgurele

In:

Out:

Universitatea Cluj

In:

Out:

UTA Arad

In:

Out:

Viitorul Târgu Jiu

In:

Out:

Transfers
Romania
2019-20